Tevfik Lav (11 July 1959 – 4 April 2004) was a Turkish football manager.

References

1959 births
2004 deaths
Turkish football managers
Denizlispor managers
Siirtspor managers
Gaziantepspor managers
MKE Ankaragücü managers
Konyaspor managers